Lilian Patricia Lita Roza (14 March 1926 – 14 August 2008) was an English singer best known for her 1953 recording "(How Much Is) That Doggie in the Window?", which reached No. 1 on the UK Singles Chart. She was the first British woman to have a No. 1 hit in the UK chart.

Early life and career
Lilian Patricia Lita Roza was born in Liverpool on 14 March 1926, the eldest of seven children. She began work at an early age to support the family. She owed her sultry looks and passion to her father, an amateur accordionist and pianist of Filipino descent who played in Liverpool nightclubs.

At the age of 12, she saw an advert in the local newspaper for juvenile dancers and passed the audition. She took to the stage at that age in a pantomime, and by the time she was 15, was working with the comedian and fellow Merseysider Ted Ray. When she was 16, she answered an advertisement and got a job as a singer in the "New Yorker" club in Southport for £5 per week. Soon afterwards she signed up with the Harry Roy Orchestra in London, moving on to work with other bands of the era, including that of Edmundo Ros.

By the time she was 18, Roza had left show business, married an American and moved to Miami, Florida. However, the marriage did not last, and shortly after the Second World War, she returned to the United Kingdom. In 1950, she became the lead female singer with the Ted Heath Band, and by 1954, had achieved enough public acclaim to leave the band and pursue a solo recording career.

Roza's "(How Much Is) That Doggie in the Window?", a cover version of Patti Page's original, was the peak of her career, topping the UK Singles Chart. It made her the first British woman to have a No. 1 hit in the UK chart. Further covers of "Hey There" and "Jimmy Unknown" gave her small hits in the mid-1950s. Roza disliked her hit single so much that she never performed it live.

Personal life and death
In 1956, she married the trumpet player Ronnie Hughes. She remained a top UK recording artist during the remainder of the 1950s and was voted the Top British Female Singer in the New Musical Express poll winners' charts from 1951 to 1955. Melody Maker readers also voted her its Top Girl Singer in the dance band section of the poll in 1951 and 1952.

Roza made three appearances in UK heats for the Eurovision Song Contest selection in 1957, 1959 and 1960. On 14 March 2001, the Liverpool Wall of Fame was inaugurated opposite the Cavern Club on Mathew Street in Liverpool with Roza's presiding at the ceremony.

On 28 November 2002, she gave her last public performance on Radio Merseyside. A 22 track The Best of Lita Roza was released in 2007.

Roza died at her home in London on 14 August 2008 at the age of 82.

In tribute, Elton John said that "we just don't make singers like Lita Roza anymore".

Discography

Singles
1951 "Allentown Jail" / "I Wish I Knew"
1951 "I'm Gonna Wash That Man Right Outa My Hair" / "A Wonderful Guy"
1952 "My Very Good Friend – The Milkman" / "Colonel Bogey"
1952 "Oakie Boogie" / "Raminay"
1952 "Love, Where Are You Now?" / "High Noon"
1953 "(How Much Is) That Doggie in the Window?" / "Tell Me We'll Meet Again" – UK No. 1
1953 "Seven Lonely Days" / "No-one Will Ever Know"
1953 "Crazy Man, Crazy" / "Oo! What You Do to Me"
1954 "Changing Partners" / "Just A Dream or Two Ago"
1954 "Make Love to Me" / "Bell Bottom Blues"
1954 "Secret Love" / "Young at Heart"
1954 "Skinnie Minnie (Fishtail)" / "My Kid Brother"
1954 "Call off the Wedding" /  "The 'Mama Doll' Song"
1955 "Heartbeat" / "Leave Me Alone"
1955 "Let Me Go Lover" / "Make Yourself Comfortable"
1955 "Tomorrow" / "Foolishly"
1955 "Two Hearts, Two Kisses (Make One Love)" / "Keep Me in Mind"
1955 "The Man in the Raincoat" / "Today and Ev'ry Day"
1955 "Hey There" / "Hernando's Hideaway" – UK No. 17
1956 "Jimmy Unknown" / "The Rose Tattoo" – UK No. 15
1956 "Too Young to Go Steady" / "You're Not Alone"
1956 "No Time for Tears" / "But Love Me (Love but Me)"
1956 "Innismore" / "The Last Waltz"
1956 "Hey! Jealous Lover" / "Julie"
1957 "Lucky Lips" / "Tears Don't Care Who Cries Them"
1957 "Tonight My Heart She Is Crying" / "Five Oranges Four Apples"
1957 "I Need You" / "You've Changed"
1958 "Pretend You Don't See Him" / "Ha-Ha-Ha!"
1958 "I Need Somebody" / "You're the Greatest"
1958 "I Could Have Danced All Night" / "The Wonderful Season of Love"
1958 "Sorry, Sorry, Sorry" / "Hillside in Scotland"
1958 "Nel Blu Dipinto Di Blu (Volare)" / "It's a Boy"
1959 "This Is My Town" / "Oh Dear What Can the Matter Be"
1959 "Allentown Jail" / "Once in a While"
1959 "Let It Rain, Let It Rain" / " Maybe You'll Be There"
1965 "What Am I Supposed to Do" / "Where Do I Go from Here"
1965 "Keep Watch Over Him" / "Stranger Things Have Happened"

EPs
1956 Lita Roza
1957 Lita Roza No.2
1958 Between the Devil and the Deep Blue Sea

Albums
1955 Listening in the After-Hours
1956 Love Is the Answer 
1957 Between the Devil and the Deep Blue Sea
1958 Me on a Carousel1960 Drinka Lita Roza Day recorded on 4 May 1960

Film
Roza appeared in one feature film, as a singer in Cast a Dark Shadow'', 1955

Recorded output
In addition to those tracks listed above, Roza's recorded output included covers of songs such as "Why Don't You Believe Me?", "Smile", "That Old Black Magic", "Have You Heard?", "Come What May", "That Old Feeling", "Too Marvelous for Words" and "The Mama Doll Song".

See also
List of artists who reached number one on the UK Singles Chart
List of artists under the Decca Records label
Music of Liverpool

References

External links

Obituary in The Independent
Obituary in The Guardian
Obituary in The Times

1926 births
2008 deaths
Traditional pop music singers
English people of Spanish descent
Musicians from Liverpool
20th-century English singers
20th-century English women singers